Allans Josué Vargas Murillo (born 25 September 1993) is a Honduran professional footballer who plays for Marathón and the Honduras national team.

International career
Vargas got his first call up to the senior Honduras side for a friendly against Belize in October 2016.

References

Honduran footballers
1996 births
Living people
People from San Pedro Sula
Footballers at the 2016 Summer Olympics
Olympic footballers of Honduras
Honduras international footballers
2017 Copa Centroamericana players
2017 CONCACAF Gold Cup players
Copa Centroamericana-winning players
Real C.D. España players
Association football defenders
Central American Games gold medalists for Honduras
Central American Games medalists in football